Caryomyia caryaecola, the hickory onion gall midge, is a species of gall midges in the family Cecidomyiidae.

References

Further reading

External links

 

Cecidomyiinae
Gall-inducing insects